Faridkot may refer to:

India
 Faridkot, Punjab, a city in Punjab, India
 Faridkot district
 Faridkot (Lok Sabha constituency), one of the 13 Lok Sabha (parliamentary) constituencies in Punjab, India
 Faridkot State, a former Princely State

Pakistan
 Faridkot, Khanewal, a village of Khanewal District, Punjab
 Faridkot, Okara, a village in Okara District, Punjab
 Faridkot, Pakpattan, a village in Pakpattan District, Punjab